Systemic Consensing (German: Systemisches Konsensieren) also known as Systemic Consensus is a consensus-oriented group decision-making principle and method developed by Erich Visotschnig and Siegfried Schrotta. The principle is that minimizing participant resistance should be the highest concern when making decisions. The method asks participants to score all proposals—including the status quo—according to how much they oppose them, and selects the proposal with the lowest score.

History 
Schrotta and Visotschnig first met in 1971 while working as systems analysts in the computer industry. In 1979 a group of parents Visotschnig was part of attempted to found an alternative school in Graz, Austria. Although this was a voluntary group of friends, conflict arose whenever they were making decisions. He considered this contradictory phenomenon to be caused by their decision-making process—majority voting. It was at this point Visotschnig first thought that minimizing opposition was different, and more important, than maximizing agreement.

In 1982 Schrotta and Visotschnig first began developing a method with students in Graz. After a break, activity resumed in 2002 leading to the 'Systemic Consensing Principle' and a refined method. Over the course of their work the pair have published four books, made a website, initiated an online tool, founded an institute, and established a network of trainers.

Principle 
The Systemic Consensing Principle is to come as close to consensus as possible by minimizing resistance. Resistance is taken to mean opposition or unhappiness towards a proposal. This is justified on ethical and practical foundations.

Ethically, allowing people to express resistance is seen as fundamental to their human dignity. Making a collective decision that a person opposes, when an option exists which no one opposes, is seen as an unnecessary dismissal of personal will that can't be justified by a majority preference. The asymmetry between positive and negative preference, and the primacy of the negative, is an expression of negative utilitarianism.

Practically, decisions made with less opposition are expected to be more successful, requiring less (or no) monitoring, enforcement or sanctioning. Participants are generally expected to be more constructive in the group if they have the ability to express negativity openly, since "resistance which can't be expressed in the system, turns against the system".

The authors contrast the Systemic Consensing Principle to those of majority and consensus. Majority is seen as the "right of the strong", leading to winner-loser situations. Consensus is seen as the "right of the weak", with the veto right leading to blocking.

Method 
Proposals are gathered, with the status quo being explicitly listed as a "default solution" (also referred to as "zero option"). This is done on the basis that the current state of affairs may be preferable to all of the current proposals, and functions as a positively formulated none of the above option. Participants are encouraged to submit as many different proposals as necessary.

The participants are then asked to score the proposals according to how much resistance they have towards them. The proposal with the lowest resistance score is then selected. This is an inversion of typical scoring, where a higher score indicates higher agreement.

The details of how Systemic Consensing is practiced is flexible and situation dependent. Scoring could be done with people raising neither, one or both of their hands (a range of 0–2), or by raising numbered cards (e.g. 0–10). The scoring could be done secretly or openly.

Example 
Imagine three people, Fritz, Anna and George, who are considering what they should get together as a reward for a hard day of work. Fritz, a vegan, has had bad experiences with the vegan options in most ice-cream stores, so scores ice-cream highly. Anna is mostly fine with all the options, scoring them all low. George is a recovering alcoholic and doesn't want to be tempted by others drinking around him, so scores beer very highly. All three have significant resistance to the default solution, which would be getting nothing, so score it highly. Waffles, as the least resisted option, is group's decision.

Influence 
Thanks to the books, talks and workshops, Systemic Consensing has had significant coverage in the German-speaking world, including articles in the newspapers Die Tageszeitung, Die Deutsche Apotheker Zeitung and Die Furche. The voting work-group of Foodsharing.de and the Saxony branch of the Grassroots Democratic Party of Germany consider the use of Systemic Consensing for internal decisions.

Until now, only one of the books has been translated into English, and the official website remains available only in German, contributing to much lower reach in the English-speaking world.

See also 

 Consensus decision-making
 Sociocracy

References

Further reading 
 

Decision-making